Countess Elisabeth of Nassau-Dillenburg (born 25 September 1542 in Dillenburg – died: 18 November 1603  in Dillenburg) was a daughter of William I, Count of Nassau-Siegen and Juliana of Stolberg and was one of the sisters of William the Silent.

Marriage and issue 
On 16 June 1559, she married Count Conrad of Solms-Braunfels.  They had the following children:
John Albert I (born: 5 March 1563 – died: 14 May 1623), married Countess Agnes of Sayn-Wittgenstein.  They are the parents of Amalia of Solms-Braunfels
 Philip Frederick (born: 13 October 1560 – died: 26 June 1567)
 Juliana (born: 5 February 1562 – died: 19 February 1563)
 Eberhard (born: 11 January 1565 – died: 12 February 1596)
 Elisabeth (born: 18 March 1566 – died: 28 July 1570)
 Ernest (born: 18 November 1568 – died: 24 August 1595)
 William I (born: 18 April 1570 – died: 3 February 1635), married Maria Amalia of Nassau-Dillenburg
 Otto (born: 3 January 1572 – died: 23 July 1610)
 Reinhard (born: 27 March 1573), married Walburga Anna of Daun and, secondly, Elisabeth of Salm
 Philip (born: 29 March 1575 – died: 20 January 1628)
 Juliana (born: 7 May 1578 – died: 1634), married Louis II of Sayn-Wittgenstein
 Anna Elisabeth (born: 15 April 1580 – died: 18 August 1580)
 Henry (born: 10 March 1582 – died: 23 April 1602)
 Anna Maria (born: 3 January 1585 – died: 19 June 1586)

Amalia of Solms-Braunfels, a daughter of her eldest son John Albert I, married her nephew Frederick Henry, Prince of Orange.

Maria Amalia of Nassau-Dillenburg, the second wife of her son William I, was a daughter of Elisabeth's brother John VI, Count of Nassau-Dillenburg from his second marriage to Kunigunde Jakobäa of Simmern, so Elisabeth was both Maria's aunt and her mother-in-law.

External links 
Genealogy of Nassau

House of Nassau
People of the Eighty Years' War
1542 births
1603 deaths
16th-century German people
German countesses
Daughters of monarchs